The 2015 Lamar Hunt U.S. Open Cup Final was played on September 30, 2015, at PPL Park, now known as Talen Energy Stadium, in Chester, Pennsylvania. The match determined the winner of the 2015 U.S. Open Cup, a tournament open to amateur and professional soccer teams affiliated with the United States Soccer Federation. It was the 102nd edition of the oldest competition in United States soccer. This edition of the final was contested between Sporting Kansas City (SKC) and the Philadelphia Union. The winning club would qualify for the 2016–17 CONCACAF Champions League.

Philadelphia and Kansas City both compete in the top tier of American soccer, Major League Soccer (MLS), and bypassed the initial stages of the tournament with entries into the fourth round of play. At the time of the final, SKC was in contention for the Supporters' Shield while the Union was in the hunt for a berth in the 2015 MLS Cup Playoffs. Philadelphia secured its berth in the final by defeating the Rochester Rhinos, D.C. United, the New York Red Bulls, and Chicago Fire. Kansas City's road to the final involved victories over Saint Louis FC, FC Dallas, Houston Dynamo, and Real Salt Lake.

The match was broadcast in English on ESPN2 and in Spanish on Univision Deportes Network, making it the first time since 1999 the cup final was aired on one of the ESPN networks. Sporting Kansas City won the game 7–6 on penalties after the game ended 1–1 in regulation and in overtime.

Road to the final

Philadelphia Union 

Teams from Philadelphia and the surrounding region have had a successful history in the Open Cup: Bethlehem Steel F.C. won five trophies between 1915 and 1926, the Uhrik Truckers won in 1936, and the Philadelphia Ukrainians won four times during the 1960s. The Union's alternative jersey, worn throughout the competition, featured a large letter "B" in the lower left corner to honor Bethlehem. Previously, the Union made a run to the final of the 2014 edition of the cup, which was the club's first cup final of any competition, but lost in extra time to Seattle Sounders FC.

Sporting Kansas City 

Sporting Kansas City have previously appeared in two US Open Cup finals, winning both the 2004 and 2012 editions, and to date, are the only Kansan club to have ever won the honor. Sporting went into the Final hoping to win their third trophy in four years. To reach the final, SKC hosted all four of their cup fixtures heading to the final, which included wins over Saint Louis FC, FC Dallas, Houston Dynamo and Real Salt Lake.

Match details

References 

Lamar Hunt
2015 U.S. Open Cup
U.S. Open Cup Finals
U.S. Open Cup Final 2015
U.S. Open Cup Final 2015
Soccer in Pennsylvania
U.S. Open Cup Final 2015